The South East Counties League (SECL) was a football league for the youth teams of clubs from Southern England.

The competition grew out of the Middlesex Youth Invitation Cup set up in the 1950s by the Middlesex FA and was formerly known as the South East Counties Youth Football League. For many years it was the top level of youth football in the region, a second division was added in 1964 this more often than not included teams from division one, these teams putting out their younger youth players. There was also a League Cup called "Division One League Cup" which was, in 1986, superseded by the "South East Counties League Cup". 
The setup of the FA Premier Youth League, a nationwide competition for the top clubs, in 1997 took many of the top clubs away. The SECL continued for another season with some clubs putting out their youth reserve teams,.

However, in 1998, the Premier Youth League was expanded and renamed the FA Premier Academy League, while a second tier of nationwide youth football, the Football League Youth Alliance was founded, absorbing the remaining teams, meaning the South East Counties League was abandoned.

List of winners

References

Organizations disestablished in 1998
Youth football leagues in England
Defunct football leagues in England